Grand Hyatt Atlanta in Buckhead is a 25-story building at 3300 Peachtree Road Northeast, among restaurants and a shopping mall district of the Buckhead neighborhood in Atlanta, Georgia, USA.

History
The hotel opened in October 1990 as the Hotel Nikko Atlanta, owned by Nikko Hotels. The Japanese owners introduced Japanese Zen gardens and a sushi restaurant.

In February 1997, Hyatt Corporation purchased the hotel and renamed it the Grand Hyatt Atlanta. There were already two Hyatt hotels in the Atlanta area at that time, the Hyatt Regency Atlanta and Hyatt Regency Suites Perimeter Northwest.
 
Grand Hyatt Atlanta in Buckhead has 439 guest rooms and 20 luxury suites. The full-service hotel has two restaurants, Cassis and Onyx at the Grand.

See also 

 Hotels in Atlanta

References

External links
Official website

Hotels in Atlanta
Hyatt Hotels and Resorts
Hotels established in 1990
Hotel buildings completed in 1990